A decision desk is a team of experts that one or many US news organizations assemble to analyze incoming data about election results and project winners on election day. Decision desks use exit polling data as well as officially reported results as they come in, to project and then "call" the winners of elections on election night.

History 
Exit polling data was gathered by Voter News Service which existed from 1990 to 2003, and which was disbanded due to disastrous mistakes in the 2000 presidential election and in the 2002 elections. Afterward they formed the National Election Pool which produced skewed results in the 2004 US presidential election and in the 2016 presidential elections.

Megyn Kelly was made famous when she walked backstage to Fox News' decision desk team during the broadcast of the 2012 US presidential election results, when Karl Rove contradicted the team's prediction that Obama would win.

References

Elections in the United States
Television news in the United States